Enkobashi-cho is a Hiroden station (tram stop) on Hiroden Main Line, located in Enkobashi-cho, Minami-ku, Hiroshima.

Routes
From Enkobashi-cho Station, there are four of Hiroden Streetcar routes.

 Hiroshima Station - Hiroshima Port Route
 Hiroshima Station - Hiroden-miyajima-guchi Route
 Hiroshima Station - (via Hijiyama-shita) - Hiroshima Port Route
 Hiroshima Station - Eba Route

Connections
█ Main Line
   
Hiroshima Station — Enkobashi-cho — Matoba-cho

Around station
Enkobashi Bridge

History
Opened on November 23, 1912.
Closed from May, 1942 to February 29, 1949.
Reopened on March 1, 1949.

See also

Hiroden Streetcar Lines and Routes

References

Enkobashi-cho Station
Railway stations in Japan opened in 1912